The Real West is an American historical documentary television series hosted by Kenny Rogers which first aired on A&E cable television from 1992 to 1995. One of A&E's highest-rated series, it prompted parent company A+E Networks to create The History Channel to show reruns of The Real West and other new original programming, primarily documentaries.

References

External links
 

1990s American documentary television series
1992 American television series debuts
1995 American television series endings
English-language television shows
First-run syndicated television programs in the United States